Lander Olaetxea Ibaibarriaga (born 12 April 1993) is a Spanish professional footballer who plays for Albacete Balompié as an attacking midfielder.

Club career
Born in Abadiño, Biscay, Basque Country, Olaetxea was a SCD Durango youth graduate. He made his debuts as a senior while on loan at Iurretako KT in the 2012–13 campaign, in the regional leagues.

Olaetxea renewed with Durango on 5 July 2013, after his loan expired, and subsequently became a first team regular in Tercera División. On 19 May 2015 he signed a contract with Athletic Bilbao, being assigned to the reserves in Segunda División.

On 9 November 2015 Olaetxea made his professional debut, coming on as a late substitute for Asier Villalibre in a 2–0 home win against UE Llagostera. He left the Lions in 2017, with the B-side now in the third division, and continued to appear in the category in the following years, representing Gernika Club and UD Logroñés; he helped the latter achieve a first-ever promotion to the second division in 2020, contributing with six goals.

Olaetxea scored his first professional goal on 11 April 2021, netting the game's only in an away success over CD Mirandés. On 8 July, after suffering relegation, he moved to SD Amorebieta.

On 25 July 2022, after suffering another drop, Olaetxea signed a one-year deal with Albacete Balompié.

References

External links

1993 births
Living people
People from Abadiño
Sportspeople from Biscay
Spanish footballers
Footballers from the Basque Country (autonomous community)
Association football midfielders
Segunda División players
Segunda División B players
Tercera División players
Bilbao Athletic footballers
Gernika Club footballers
UD Logroñés players
SD Amorebieta footballers
Albacete Balompié players